

Incumbents  
 President - Árpád Göncz
 Prime Minister - József Antall (until 12 December), Péter Boross (starting 12 December)

Events 
April 3 – Hungary's first attempt to enter the Eurovision Song Contest ends in failure, as Andrea Szulák fails to win a place in the final rounds.
August 15 – The Hungarian Grand Prix is held at the Hungaroring in Budapest and is won by Damon Hill.
 December 21 – The Hungarian Parliament elects Péter Boross Prime Minister of Hungary following the death of József Antall on December 12.

Births
January 19 - Bence Biczó, swimmer

Deaths

January

 January 6 – Judit Tóth, 86, Hungarian gymnast and Olympic medalist.
 January 23 – Gábor Péter, 86, Hungarian communist politician.
 January 31 – Ernő Lendvaï, 67, Hungarian music theorist.

February

February – Gusztáv Bene, boxer (born 1911)

See also
 List of Hungarian films since 1990

References

 
1990s in Hungary
Hungary
Hungary